Thomas Drummond (1797–1840) was a Scottish civil engineer.

Thomas Drummond may also refer to:
 Thomas Drummond (botanist) (1793–1835), Scottish botanical collector
 Thomas Drummond (judge) (1809–1890), American judge
 Thomas Drummond (politician) (1833–1865), American politician and Civil War soldier from Iowa
 Thomas Drummond, Lord Drummond (1742–1780), Scottish landowner and diplomat
 Tom Drummond (footballer) (1897–1970), Australian rules footballer
 Tom Drummond (musician) (born 1969), American musician, bassist for Better Than Ezra